Shewket Imin (born December 1959) is a Chinese politician of Uyghur origin, currently serving as chairman of the Standing Committee of the People's Congress of Xinjiang Uygur Autonomous Region.

He was a delegate to the 12th National People's Congress and is a delegate to the 13th National People's Congress.

Biography
Shewket Imin was born in Manas County, Xinjiang, in December 1959. From October 1977 to October 1979, he was a teacher at Xinhe High School in his home-county. In 1979, he was admitted to Xinjiang Normal University, majoring in track and field. He joined the Chinese Communist Party in June 1981. After graduating in 1983, he stayed at the university and worked there for eight years.

In December 1991, he was appointed deputy party secretary of Turpan and two years later was admitted to member of the standing committee of the Turpan Party Committee, the city's top authority. He also served as secretary of its Commission for Discipline Inspection, the party's agency in charge of anti-corruption efforts. In April 1994, he was appointed secretary of the Xinjiang Uygur Autonomous Region Party Committee of the Communist Youth League of China, a position he held until October 1998, when he was transferred to Ili Kazakh Autonomous Prefecture and appointed deputy party secretary. In July 2000, he moved back to Ürümqi and became director of Radio, Film and Television Administration of Xinjiang Uygur Autonomous Region. In December 2004, he was promoted to member of the standing committee of the Xinjiang Party Committee, the region's top authority. He concurrently served as head of United Front Work Department of Xinjiang Uygur Autonomous Region Committee of the Chinese Communist Party. On 26 January 2018, he was proposed as chairman of the Standing Committee of the People's Congress of Xinjiang Uygur Autonomous Region.

References

1959 births
Living people
People from Manas County
Uyghur politicians
Xinjiang Normal University alumni
People's Republic of China politicians from Xinjiang
Chinese Communist Party politicians from Xinjiang
Delegates to the 12th National People's Congress
Delegates to the 13th National People's Congress